Café Bossa is the debut album by Filipino bossa nova singer Sitti. It was released on January 25, 2006 by Warner Music Philippines. The album spawned four successful singles—"Tattooed on My Mind", "Hey Look at the Sun", "I Didn't Know I Was Looking for Love" and "Para sa Akin". The album was certified double platinum by the Philippine Association of the Record Industry on September 17, 2006, denoting over 60,000 units sold in the country.

A limited edition of the album was released in February 2007, containing a bonus video CD and a different cover. The video CD includes her official music videos from the album and her MTV Sessions Live performance. It was also released on digital download through iTunes and Amazon.com.

Track listing
All tracks were produced by Neil C. Gregorio.

Personnel
Credits were taken from Titik Pilipino.

Production
Joseph De Vera - album cover art and design
Neil C. Gregorio - album producer, A & R, sequencing
Ricky R. Ilacad - executive producer, A & R
Mark Laccay - studio recording
Pazzy Marquez - styling and grooming
Paolo Pineda - album photography
Dante Tanedo - mixing
Frey Zambrano - A & R, production coordinator

Musicians
Erskine Basilio - acoustic guitar
Marcy Estrella - percussions
Archie Lacorte - saxophone, flute
Sitti Navarro - lead vocals
Jerome Rico - semi-hollow guitar (track 7)
Vic San Juan - electric, upright bass
Chito Servanez - piano, clavinova
Sonny Teodoro - drums, additional percussions

Recording locations
Stone House Bar (Quezon City, Philippines) - album recording
Warner Chili Red Studio - sequencing

Certifications

Footnotes

a.Erroneously credited to Julie London, who recorded a well-known version of the song.

References

2006 debut albums
Sitti albums
Warner Music Philippines albums